Effie Shannon (May 13, 1867 – July 24, 1954) was an American stage and silent screen actress.

Biography
Shannon had a 60-year career as starring performer and later character actress. She began as a child actor appearing with John McCullough and later in 1886 with Robert B. Mantell. She was one of the founding members of the Twelfth Night Club for female actresses in 1891 (along with Alice Fisher, Lelena Fisher and Maida Craigen).

Her partner and/or husband was Herbert Kelcey who died in 1917. They appeared in numerous plays as a team predating by a generation the famous Lunt and Fontanne as a great Broadway romantic team. Effie's sister, Winona Shannon (1874-1950) was also an actress and regularly performed in the Herbert Kelcey and Effie Shannon Company. In 1914, Effie appeared in her first silent film along with Kelcey. They made one more film together in 1916 before his 1917 death. Shannon continued to appear in silent films and early sound films until 1932 while still appearing on Broadway. One of her later roles was in a revival of Arsenic and Old Lace.

Filmography

References

External links

Effie Shannon at IBDB
Effie Shannon portrait gallery at the NY Public Library, Billy Rose Collection
stage actress Effie Shannon University of Washington, Sayre Collection
Portraits of Effie Shannon, University of Louisville, Macauley Theatre Collection, #1, #2

1867 births
1954 deaths
19th-century American actresses
American stage actresses
American silent film actresses
Actresses from Cambridge, Massachusetts
20th-century American actresses
People from Bay Shore, New York